Karl Eirik Schjøtt-Pedersen (born 3 October 1959 in Vardø)  is a Norwegian politician for the Labour Party. He is currently the Auditor General of Norway since 2022. He was a parliamentary representative for Finnmark from 1985 to 2009. He served as Minister of Fisheries from 1996 to 1997 and Minister of Finance from 2000 to 2001 in the first cabinet Stoltenberg. Pedersen was Chief of Staff at the Office of the Prime Minister and a member of the Cabinet from 2006 to 2013. From 2015 to 2020 he was the CEO at Norwegian Oil and Gas.

Family and education
Schjøtt-Pedersen was born in Vardø in Finnmark in 1959, as the son of duty manager Odd Eirik Schjøtt Pedersen (1925–1993) and tax assessment secretary Aslaug Berntine Nilssen (1923–1981). He has a degree from a two-year course with a trade course from 1977, as well as a degree in art from 1978. He has a master's degree with political science, social economics and public law from the University of Oslo from 1985 and Master of Business Administration from Copenhagen Business School from 2015.

Career

Parliament
Schjøtt-Pedersen was a deputy member from 1981 to 1985, when he was elected a full time member. He was re-elected in 1989, and was so until 2009. While he was minister and part of government from 1996 to 1997, 2000 to 2001 and 2006 to 2013, his seat in Parliament was covered by deputies Gunnar Mathisen (1996–1997), Einar Johansen (2000–2001) and Alf E. Jakobsen (2006–2013).

Government

Post politics
In March 2015, he became chairman of the board of Sparebank 1 Nord-Norge.

Two months later, in May 2015, he became the CEO of Norwegian Oil and Gas. He stepped down from the position in early January 2020, but remained in place until a successor was appointed. He stated that "everything has an end", and added that he thought it was time for someone new to take over. He was subsequently succeeded by Anniken Hauglie.

In February 2020, he became a partner in the socio-economic analysis company Menon Economics.

Auditor General of Norway
In November 2021, he was nominated as the next Auditor General of Norway, succeeding retiring Per-Kristian Foss. He assumed office on 1 January 2022. 

Upon assuming office, Schjøtt-Pedersen took over the investigation into members of Parliament's economic schemes. He called it "an important mission" and called the trust in elected officials "determining for the whole democratic system". He went on to say: "It is unusual for a Office of the Auditor General to generally be commissioned to review matters of such significance to the elected representatives. It is also unusual for the Storting to impose such a review. The Office of the Auditor General does not usually go into individual cases, but we will do so now".

In October, he presented a report into the Norwegian Army's information systems which determined that there were numerous vulnerabilities. Schjøtt-Pedersen also stated that the findings pinpoints serious concerns and consequences for national security.

In December, he presented a report looking into the authorities control over waste which is exported from Norway. The report concludes that Norwegian authorities' handling of the issue is critic worthy, parts of the exporting is illegal and that control over waste is lacking.

Personal life
He is married to Grete Lorck, whom he met in Oslo in 1986. Together they have three children.

References

External links

1959 births
Government ministers of Norway
Living people
People from Vardø
Labour Party (Norway) politicians
Members of the Storting
Ministers of Finance of Norway
21st-century Norwegian politicians
20th-century Norwegian politicians